Stockholm is a village in Pepin County, Wisconsin, United States, founded in 1854 by immigrants from Karlskoga, Sweden, who named it after their country's capital. The population was 78 at the 2020 census. The village is located within the Town of Stockholm.

Demographics

2010 census

As of the census of 2010, there were 66 people, 36 households, and 21 families residing in the village. The racial makeup of the village was 100.0% White.

There were 36 households, of which 11.1% had children under the age of 18 living with them, 52.8% were married couples living together, 5.6% had a female householder with no husband present, and 41.7% were non-families. 38.9% of all households were made up of individuals, and 16.7% had someone living alone who was 65 years of age or older. The average household size was 1.83 and the average family size was 2.33.

The median age in the village was 59.3 years. 9.1% of residents were under the age of 18; 0% were between the ages of 18 and 24; 16.6% were from 25 to 44; 45.5% were from 45 to 64; and 28.8% were 65 years of age or older. The gender makeup of the village was 53.0% male and 47.0% female.

2000 census
As of the census of 2000, there were 97 people, 48 households, and 30 families residing in the village. The racial makeup of the village was 100.00% white.

There were 48 households, out of which 16.7% had children under the age of 18 living with them, 56.3% were married couples living together, 4.2% had a female householder with no husband present, and 37.5% were non-families. 31.3% of all households were made up of individuals, and 6.3% had someone living alone who was 65 years of age or older. The average household size was 2.02 and the average family size was 2.53.

In the village, the population was spread out, with 15.5% under the age of 18, 6.2% from 18 to 24, 14.4% from 25 to 44, 42.3% from 45 to 64, and 21.6% who were 65 years of age or older. The median age was 52 years. For every 100 females, there were 120.5 males. For every 100 females age 18 and over, there were 121.6 males.

The median income for a household in the village was $41,250, and the median income for a family was $46,250. Males had a median income of $26,250 versus $26,667 for females. The per-capita income for the village was $55,006, and 8.6% of the population is below the poverty line.

See also
 Stockholm, Sweden

References

Bibliography

External links

Stockholm, Wisconsin
Information about Stockholm, Wisconsin

Villages in Pepin County, Wisconsin
Villages in Wisconsin
Populated places established in 1854
Swedish-American culture in Wisconsin
Wisconsin populated places on the Mississippi River
1854 establishments in Wisconsin